The Old Wakulla County Courthouse (constructed in 1892–1893) is a historic site in Crawfordville, Florida, located at Church Street. On May 3, 1976, it was added to the U.S. National Register of Historic Places. Thought to be Florida's last wood-frame courthouse still in use, it was restored and became a Wakulla County library.

References

External links
 Wakulla County listings at National Register of Historic Places
 Florida's Office of Cultural and Historical Programs
 Wakulla County listings
 Old Wakulla County Courthouse
 Wakulla County Courthouse at Florida's Historic Courthouses
 Florida's Historic Courthouses by Hampton Dunn

County courthouses in Florida
Courthouses on the National Register of Historic Places in Florida
Buildings and structures in Wakulla County, Florida
National Register of Historic Places in Wakulla County, Florida